Atami Yowado (熱海陽和洞), Koyata Iwasaki Memorial Museum, was a second house of Koyata Iwasaki (岩崎小彌太), the fourth and last president of the Old Mitsubishi Organization, located in Atami, Shizuoka Prefecture, Japan. It emulates the 16th century British Tudor style.

In April 1978, member companies of the Mitsubishi Kinyokai, core 29 companies of Mitsubishi Group, inaugurated "Management committee of Atami Yowado" (熱海陽和洞管理委員会). Atami Yowado is exclusively opened for members of the committee.

External links
Architectural Legacy of the old Mitsubishi organization
History of Koyata Iwasaki
Management committee of Atami Yowado (in Japanese)

Mitsubishi
Former buildings and structures in Japan